Portvoller is a small village on the north tip of the Eye Peninsula (which along with Melbost and Parkend makes up Point), on the Isle of Lewis in northwestern Scotland. Portvoller is within the parish of Stornoway.

About the village 
Portvoller's most prominent feature is the Tiumpan Head Lighthouse, which is located at the northernmost tip of the village.

Portvoller is also near some of the Western Isles' best fishing waters, especially rock fishing or beach casting. The headlands that are most popular for these pursuits are known locally as Billy Mor (Bilidh Mhor) and Foitelair (Foitealar). These two fishing hotspots are found about five minutes' walk from the ruined Portvoller slipway—a walk that can be a treacherous clamber after a squall or downpour. The Portvoller slipway is also near to small and secluded Shinega (Sinigeadh) beach.

Etymology 
The village name probably originates from the Old Norse word voller (the plural of vollen, still used in some dialects of Norwegian, which denotes a hill that slants upwards gradually). Indeed, this is a quite appropriate description of the village of Portvoller.

In the period from the ninth to the twelfth century, Viking raids on the island would have been commonplace. When Norway occupied Lewis before the Treaty of Perth and the Battle of Largs, Portvoller would have been a principal landing place for arrivals from Norway.

Surrounding villages 
The village has several others surrounding it, including Portnaguran, Aird, Broker and Flesherin, all of which are served by the one post office, off-licence and shop. All the aforenamed villages are served by the Western Isles Council in terms of public transport and other services.

References

External links 

Photo of Portvoller Bay archive.org
Geograph images of the area around Portvoller

Villages in the Isle of Lewis